State Highway 125 (abbreviated SH-125) is a state highway in northeastern Oklahoma that is  long. It begins in the south at Grand Lake O' the Cherokees, ending in Miami at US-69/SH-10. It has no lettered spur routes.

SH-125 was established in the late 1950s as a gravel spur to Monkey Island from US-59. It was paved within the first five years of its existence, and was extended north to Miami in the early 1970s.

Route description
State Highway 125 begins on Monkey Island, a peninsula jutting into Grand Lake, at the Shangri-La resort at the southern tip of the peninsula. From the southern terminus, the highway proceeds northeast through a series of sharp curves, providing access to Grand Lake Regional Airport, a general aviation facility. It continues north to the former Teramiranda Airport, then crosses Echo Bay, leaving Monkey Island. North of the junction, SH-125 makes a hard right, turning east, then a hard left, turning it back on a northward course. After negotiating a few curves west of Copeland, SH-125 crosses from Delaware County into Ottawa County.

SH-125 intersects US-59 just north of the county line. SH-125 overlaps US-60 for  before splitting away to the north. The highway turns west as it approaches Miami, crossing over I-44 (the Will Rogers Turnpike) with no direct access. As it enters Miami, it turns to the north, curving northeast to bridge the Neosho River, one of the two primary tributaries of Grand Lake. As the route lands on the north shore of the river, it begins to follow South Main Street. SH-125 ends at Steve Owens Boulevard (3rd Avenue), which carries US-69 and SH-10.

History
SH-125 first appears on the 1959 edition of the Oklahoma state highway map. Initially, it began at Monkey Island and had a northern terminus at US-59 (which, at the time, was also concurrent with SH-25). In 1959, the entirety of SH-125 had a gravel driving surface. By 1961, the highway had been paved. The highway's northern terminus was moved to Miami by 1972, extending it through rural Ottawa County and Fairland. No major changes to the highway have occurred since then.

Junction list

References

External links

 SH-125 at OKHighways

125
Transportation in Delaware County, Oklahoma
Transportation in Ottawa County, Oklahoma